Ankers Bower (also Anker's Bower, Ankers' Bower, Ankersbower, or Anchor's Bower) is a townland and hill in St. Mary's civil parish in the barony of Brawny, County Westmeath, Ireland. It is partly within the former urban district of Athlone. The name may derive from John Ankers, who was vicar of St. Mary's in 1608.

Population and area
The decennial censuses of Ireland from 1841 to 1911 included demographic data broken down by townland, except that from 1871 the area under the jurisdiction of town commissioners was combined into a single figure, with any rural portion of a townland listed separately. A 2003 statutory instrument, the Athlone Town Boundary Alteration Order, 2003, included more of the townland within the Athlone town boundary; the Local Government Reform Act 2014 abolished Athlone town council.

Sitting largely within the town of Athlone in the Athlone East Urban electoral division, the townland had a population of 341 as of the 2011 census.

References

Townlands of County Westmeath
Mountains and hills of County Westmeath
Athlone